Corymbia arenaria, commonly known as bundah bundah or black bloodwood, is a species of tree that is endemic to the northern Kimberley region of Western Australia. It has rough bark on the trunk and branches, lance-shaped to curved adult leaves, flower buds in groups of seven, white flower and spherical urn-shaped fruit.

Description
It has rough, fissured, tessellated, flaky or crumbly brownish bark on the trunk and branches. Flowering occurs in January or June and the flowers are white. The seeds are reddish brown and boat-shaped, oval or elliptical with a wing on the end.

Taxonomy and naming
Bundah bundah was first formally described in 1934 by William Blakely in his book A Key to the Eucalypts from specimens collected by Charles Gardner near the King Edward River in 1921. In 1995, Ken Hill and Lawrie Johnson changed the name to Corymbia arenaria. The specific epithet (arenaria) is from the Latin word arenarius meaning "growing on sand", referring to the habitat as recorded by Gardner.

Distribution and habitat
Corymbia arenaria is found along the north coast of the Kimberley region of Western Australia on plateaus, ridges and at the bases of cliffs where it grows in shallow sandy soils over sandstone.

See also
 List of Corymbia species

References

arenaria
Myrtales of Australia
Rosids of Western Australia
Plants described in 1934